Julianowo  is a village in the administrative district of Gmina Barcin, within Żnin County, Kuyavian-Pomeranian Voivodeship, in north-central Poland.

The village has a population of 169.

References

Julianowo